Black Magick Sorceress is an EP by the Swedish death doom metal band Runemagick. It was released in 2005 on Aftermath Music on vinyl only.

Track listing

Side A
 "Black Magick Sorceress" – 14:01

Side B
 "The Rising" – 3:33
 "Wizard with the Magick Runes" – 4:48

Credits
 Nicklas "Terror" Rudolfsson - vocals, guitar
 Emma Karlsson - bass
 Daniel Moilanen - drums

References 

Runemagick albums
2005 EPs